Ergash Rahmatullayevich Shoismatov (Russified form Shaismatov is also used) was the Deputy Prime Minister of Uzbekistan between 2012 and 2016. He was born on 1951 and is a graduate of Tashkent Polytechnical Institute.

On 30 August 2006 Shoismatov announced that the Uzbek government and an international consortium consisting of state-run Uzbekneftegaz, LUKoil Overseas, Petronas, Korea National Oil Corporation, and China National Petroleum Corporation had signed a production-sharing agreement to explore and develop oil and gas fields in the Aral Sea, saying, "The Aral Sea is largely unknown, but it holds a lot of promise in terms of finding oil and gas. There is risk, of course, but we believe in the success of this unique project." The consortium was created in September 2005.

See also
Islam Karimov
Shavkat Mirziyoyev

References

Living people
Government ministers of Uzbekistan
Musicians from Tashkent
1951 births